The Fejér County Council is the local legislative body of Fejér County, in Hungary. After the elections in 2019, it consists 20 councillors, and is controlled by the Fidesz which has 14 councillors, versus  2 Democratic Coalition, 2 Momentum Movement, 1 Our Homeland Movement and 1 Independent councillors.

Sources 

Local government in Hungary
Fejér County